Kidwelly is a town and community in Carmarthenshire, southwest Wales, approximately  northwest of the most populous town in the county, Llanelli. In the 2001 census the community of Kidwelly returned a population of 3,289, increasing to 3,523 at the 2011 Census.

It lies on the River Gwendraeth above Carmarthen Bay. The community includes Mynyddgarreg and Llangadog.

History
The earliest written form of the name, 'Cetgueli', is recorded by the monk, Nennius, writing in the 9th century. One theory is that the name means the land, territory, or kingdom of Cadwal. Another theory is that the name is the combination of the two words Cyd (joint) and Gweli (bed), i.e., the joining of the two river beds Gwendraeth Fawr and Gwendraeth Fach, wherein Cydweli lies. The town itself is ancient and is shrouded in mystery of its founding, but the most popular theory is that it was founded by local warlords since the area was part of the Ystrad Tywi.

The substantial and well preserved castle and church were established by the invading Normans in 1106. The earliest castle on the site was a typical Norman motte and bailey design that was made of earth and timber. The 13th century re-design was commissioned by Edward I Longshanks as a strategic part of his 'Ring of Steel' oppression against the Welsh. At the time of the stone castle's creation, Kidwelly benefited from the latest strategic military thinking in castle design. It had a concentric design with one circuit of defensive walls set within another to allow the castle to be held even if the outer wall should fall. The great gatehouse was begun late in the 14th century but it was not completed until 1422, somewhat due to the Welsh rebel Owain Glyndŵr’s efforts to reclaim Welsh independence.

A field in the neighbouring forest of Kingswood, Maes Gwenllian is known as the location of a battle in 1136, in which Princess Gwenllian, sister of Owain Gwynedd, led her husband's troops into battle against a Norman army during his absence. She is believed to have been killed either during the battle or shortly afterwards, historians debate whether her death was at Maes Gwenllian or if she was marched back to Kidwelly Castle to be beheaded there.

Although being an ancient town, Kidwelly grew significantly during the industrial revolution, as did many other towns in southern Wales. The town was home to a large brickworks and tinworks. Little evidence now exists of such activities since the closure of the industrial works, with the exception of Kidwelly Industrial Museum.

The population of Kidwelly in 1841 was 1,563.

An atmospheric quotation from a despondent vicar in the nineteenth century provides insight to times gone by;

''Kidwelly Parish Church records, 1851

"Remarks: [MS torn] . . . Lords day in this Town is but very little regarded as a day for spiritual worship [pub] lick houses are allowed to be open, and frequented during Divine Service. This is the cause why places [of wor]ship are so little frequented and religion so little appreciated and professed at Kidwelly." Thomas Griffiths, Vicar

Tourism
Local attractions include Kidwelly Castle, founded in 1106; a fourteenth-century bridge and gate; the former quay (now a nature reserve); a Norman parish church, and an industrial museum.

Kidwelly Carnival is an annual event held on the second Saturday of July. Previous carnivals have featured aerial displays.

The town is twinned with French village Saint-Jacut-de-la-Mer on the north coast of Brittany.

Transport
Road – Kidwelly is connected to Llanelli and Carmarthen by the A484 road.

Bus/Coach – There are local buses running through Kidwelly, linking the town with Llanelli and Carmarthen, with a main stop in the town centre. Some services were withdrawn in 2014. There is a Coach Park located in the town centre.

Rail – Kidwelly railway station is on the West Wales Line. Westbound services from Kidwelly terminate at Carmarthen or Pembroke Dock, with less frequent direct services to Fishguard Harbour and Milford Haven. Eastbound services terminate at Swansea or Cardiff Central, with less frequent direct services to Manchester Piccadilly and London Paddington.

Cycling – Kidwelly is connected to the National Cycle Network along the coast from the east and west by NCR 4. The cycle path runs directly through the town centre.

The nearest airport with domestic and international scheduled flights is Cardiff Airport.

Walking – There are numerous public footpaths and bridleways in Kidwelly and Mynydd-y-Garreg, including Glan yr Afon, just behind the Wesleyan Chapel on the Bridge and Summer Way (Maes yr Haf) off Water Street.

Government
Kidwelly is governed on a local level by Carmarthenshire County Council and on a community level by Kidwelly Town Council, who appoint a Mayor of Kidwelly and Mynydd-y-Garreg.

It is located within the UK Parliament constituency of Llanelli, represented by the Welsh Labour MP Nia Griffith, and within the Welsh Assembly Constituency of Llanelli, also represented by the Welsh Labour AM Lee Waters.

The community is bordered by the communities of: Llandyfaelog; Llangyndeyrn; Trimsaran; Pembrey and Burry Port Town; and St Ishmael, all being in Carmarthenshire.

Notable people 

 William Jones (1676–1725), Principal of Jesus College, Oxford, from 1720 to 1725
 Thomas Pardo (died 1763), Principal of Jesus College, Oxford, from 1727 to 1763.
 Gordon Lewis (born 1936), a Welsh former rugby union, and professional rugby league footballer with over 400 club caps 
 Ray Gravell (1951–2007), a Welsh rugby union centre with 23 caps for Wales

Sport

The local rugby union team is Kidwelly RFC, a club formed in the 1880s which now plays in the Welsh Rugby Union league. They play their home games at Parc Stephen's, Kidwelly. Parc Stephen's is also the home venue of local football, cricket and lawn bowls teams. The football team is Kidwelly Town AFC.  Pembrey Circuit is about 3 miles away hosting races and rallies.

See also
Church of Saint Mary, Kidwelly

References

Further reading

External links

Kidwelly Town Council - Includes Visitors` Guide
Kidwelly Castle Official Website
Kidwelly Industrial Museum Official site
www.geograph.co.uk : photos of Kidwelly and surrounding area

 
Towns in Carmarthenshire
Carmarthenshire electoral wards
Communities in Carmarthenshire